The Men's alpine combined competition at the FIS Alpine World Ski Championships 2023 was held at L'Éclipse ski course in Courchevel on 7 February 2023.

Results
The super-G was started at 11:00 and the slalom at 14:30.

References

Men's alpine combined